Captain D's is an American fast casual restaurant chain that specializes in seafood and is headquartered in Nashville, Tennessee. The chain was founded as Mr. D's Seafood and Hamburgers by Raymond L. Danner Sr. on August 15, 1969, in Donelson, Tennessee. The chain is currently owned by private-equity firm Centre Partners. Captain D's has more than 500 locations in the United States.

History
Mr. D's Seafood and Hamburgers opened in 1969 after entrepreneur, owner of Danner Foods and  KFC franchisee Raymond L. Danner Sr. was unable to expand the territory of his Shoney's Big Boy Restaurants franchise. The franchise was limited to 11 states in the Southeast. In 1971, Danner and his Shoney's co-founder Alex Schoenbaum completed a merger between Shoney's and Danner Foods and named their new company Shoney’s Big Boy Enterprises. In 1975, Danner was president of the company, which announced the renaming of Mr. D's Seafood and Hamburgers as "Captain D's" and the launch of a national franchising program. By this time, Captain D's menu was edited to focus on seafood and side dishes, and the chain had expanded to 32 locations that earned more than $10 million annually. In 1976, Captain D's was held by the rebranded Shoney's Inc., after Danner and Schoenbaum sold the Big Boy trademark to Marriott Corporation.

Throughout the 1970s, the company grew rapidly and added special programs like the Kids' Birthday Club and children's comic books. During the 1980s and 1990s, the company's logo and building design evolved.

On September 13, 2010, Phil Greifeld was appointed CEO of Captain D's.

Throughout 2016, Captain D's experienced a surge of franchise and corporate development, with 13 new locations opened, along with numerous development agreements signed to open additional restaurants. This ongoing growth expanded the brand's presence, including in Alabama, Arkansas, Florida, Georgia, Illinois, Kentucky, Louisiana, North Carolina, South Carolina, Tennessee, Texas, and Virginia.

Racial discrimination lawsuit
In April 1989, the NAACP Legal Defense and Educational Fund filed a class-action lawsuit against Danner and more than 200 other Shoney's Inc. officials for allegedly implementing discriminatory policies against black people who sought employment or were then employed with Shoney's Inc. restaurants—Shoney's, Captain D's, Lee's Famous Recipe Chicken, Pargo's and the Fifth Quarter. Nine former employees and job applicants of Shoney's Inc. restaurants sought more than $500 million as well as an affirmative action plan authorized by the court to prevent discriminatory policies in the future. In November 1992, Captain D's was involved in the $105 million settlement of the racial discrimination case against then-parent company Shoney's Inc. and Danner agreed to contribute $65 million of the company's stock toward the settlement amount. The settlement was awarded to the more than 40,000 former, then-current and prospective restaurant employees who claimed they were discriminated against or were ordered to engage in discriminatory practices between February 1988 and April 1991.

Acquisitions
In January 2005, Sagittarius Brand, Inc. acquired Captain D's for $150 million. To gain capital, the holding company sold Captain D's to buyout firm Sun Capital Partners, Inc in 2010. 

After Spectrum Restaurant Group Inc. filed for chapter 11 bankruptcy in 2006, Captain D's bought its restaurant chain Grandy's as a subsidiary.

In 2013, Sun Capital Partners Inc. sold Captain D's to its affiliate, Centre Partners Management.

In 2017, Centre Partners sold the chain to Sentinel Capital Partners.

Products
Captain D's offers fried fish, shrimp, lobster, crab and chicken meals, platters and sandwiches. The fish and shrimp options come grilled or fried. The appetizers include fried mozzarella sticks, jalapeño poppers, clam strips and butterfly shrimp. The side dishes include coleslaw, French fries, green beans, okra, broccoli, baked potato, corn, mac & cheese and hush puppies. The dessert menu includes cheesecake and funnel cake stix.

In 2019, PepsiCo announced that it would partner with Captain D's as its only beverage supplier.

As of 2021, Captain D's restaurants are sourced by 60 food suppliers.

Operations
In 2020, Captain D's announced its Express prototype, a 960-square-foot building model with drive-thru and walkup windows only. The first Express unit was set to open in College Park, Georgia, in 2021.

In 2021, Captain D's announced the debut of its double drive-thru in Tupelo, Mississippi.

See also
 List of seafood restaurants

References

Companies based in Nashville, Tennessee
Economy of the Midwestern United States
Economy of the Southeastern United States
Seafood restaurants in the United States
Fast casual restaurants
Fish and chip restaurants
Regional restaurant chains in the United States
Fast-food chains of the United States
Restaurants established in 1969
Fast-food seafood restaurants
1969 establishments in Tennessee
1984 mergers and acquisitions
2017 mergers and acquisitions
American companies established in 1969